McLean school or MacLean school or variant may refer to:

 McLean School of Maryland, K-12 coed school in Potomac, Maryland, USA
 McLean High School, high school in McLean, Virginia, USA
 McLean High School (Texas), aka "McLean School", high school in McLean, Texas, USA 
 McLean Independent School District, school board in McLean, Texas, USA 
 McLean Primary School, primary school in Dunfermline, Fife, Scotland
 MacLean Elementary School, elementary school in British Columbia, Canada
 Macleans Primary School, primary school in  Bucklands Beach, Auckland, New Zealand
 Macleans College, coed secondary school in  Bucklands Beach, Auckland, New Zealand

See also 

 McLean (disambiguation)

Set index articles